The first contact between Greece and Sweden can be traced back to the 11th century. Both countries established diplomatic relations in 1852. Both countries are members of the Organisation for Economic Co-operation and Development, of the Organization for Security and Co-operation in Europe, and of the European Union. Greece is a full member of NATO. Sweden is not a full member. Greece has given full support to Sweden's membership of the European Union. Greece supports Sweden's NATO membership.

History
Diplomatic relations between Sweden and Greece were established in 1833, a few years after the Greek War of Independence. The first trade agreement between Sweden and Greece was signed in 1852.

In September 1934, the Crown Prince Gustaf Adolf and Crown Princess Margaret and Princess Ingrid visited Greece with the Svenska Orient Linien's motor ship Vasaland. They stopped at Patras, visited the paper mill in Aegion. On 20 September, they arrived in Piraeus, where they traveled by train to Athens, where they were received by president Alexandros Zaimis and representatives of government agencies. They also visited Delphi, Nafplio and Delos with the cruiser Hellas. On 28 September, Vasaland departed for Thessaloniki and then on to Istanbul on 2 October.

The Swedish Institute at Athens (SIA) was founded in 1946 with archeology as its main purpose. A double taxation agreement was signed in 1963.

In 1967, Sweden and three other countries brought the Greek Case against the Greek junta regime for human rights violations. Stockholm was since 1968 the base of the Panhellenic Liberation Movement resistance organization.

Since 1991, there has been a Swedish-Greek Chamber of Commerce in Athens. Business Sweden monitors Greece from Milan. There are about 40 Swedish-affiliated companies operating in Greece - most in the Athens area.

List of bilateral treaties and agreements

 Treaty on Trade and Shipping (1852)
 Agreements or Memoranda have been signed since 1929
 Avoidance of Double Taxation of Income or capital (1961)
 Social Security (1984)
 Defense Cooperation (1999)

List of recent bilateral visits

To Sweden
 27 June 2006: Prime Minister of Greece Kostas Karamanlis visited Stockholm
 20–22 May 2008: state visit of President of Greece Karolos Papoulias
 2009: Prime Minister of Greece Kostas Karamanlis and Minister for Foreign Affairs Dora Bakoyannis on an official visit to Sweden
 August 2011: Minister for Foreign Affairs Stavros Lambrinidis visited Stockholm
 April 2012: Minister of Health and Social Solidarity Andreas Loverdos visited Stockholm
 April 2013: Minister of Tourism Olga Kefalogianni visited Stockholm
 February 2016: Minister for European Affairs Nikos Xydakis visited Stockholm
 October 2016: Minister of International Economic Relations Dimitris Mardas visited Stockholm
 March 2017: Minister for European Affairs Georgios Katrougalos visited Stockholm
 October 2019: Minister for European Affairs Miltiadis Varvitsiotis visited Stockholm

To Greece
 24 October 2007: visit of Minister for Foreign Affairs Carl Bildt to Athens
 September 2009: Victoria, Crown Princess of Sweden visited Greece
 2010: Minister for Gender Equality Nyamko Sabuni visited Athens
 2010: Försvarsutskottet visited Athens
 2010: Swedish Migration Agency visited Athens
 2011: Speaker of the Riksdag with a delegation as well as the Committee on Social Insurance
 26-27 March 2013: Minister for Foreign Affairs Carl Bildt visited Athens
 16 September 2013: Minister for Foreign Affairs Carl Bildt visited Athens
 11 October 2013: Minister for EU Affairs Birgitta Ohlsson visited Athens
 2014: During the first half of 2014, a number of cabinet ministers and State Secretaries visited Athens to attend various informal ministerial meetings organized by the Greek Presidency of the Council of the European Union.
 16 september 2014: Minister for Foreign Affairs Carl Bildt visited Athens
 11 May 2015: State Secretary Hans Dahlgren visited Athens
 August 2016: Committee on Justice visited Greece
 10-12 November 2016: State Secretary Pernilla Baralt visited Athens
 March 2017: Minister for Children, the Elderly and Gender Equality Åsa Regnér visited Athens
 September 2017: Committee on the Labour Market visited Athens
 17 September 2017: Minister for Foreign Affairs Margot Wallström visited Athens to speak at the Athens Democracy Forum
 October 2017: Minister for Higher Education and Research Helene Hellmark Knutsson visited Athens
 March 2019: Landsbygdsminister Jennie Nilsson visited Athens
 May 2019: Victoria, Crown Princess of Sweden visited Athens
 October 2019: Former Minister for Foreign Affairs Margot Wallström visited Athens
 December 2019: Minister for EU Affairs Hans Dahlgren visited Athens
 January 2020: Committee on Social Insurance visited Athens and Malakasa

Resident diplomatic missions
Greece has an embassy in Stockholm, and Sweden has an embassy in Athens.

See also
Foreign relations of Greece 
Foreign relations of Sweden 
Swedish Greeks
Greeks in Sweden 
Accession of Sweden to the European Union

References

External links
Greek Ministry of Foreign Affairs about the relation with Sweden
Greek embassy in Stockholm
Swedish embassy in Athens

 
Sweden
Greece